Bayfield (Scottish Gaelic:An Abhainn Bheag) is a community in the Canadian province of Nova Scotia, located  in Antigonish County. The community is named after Henry Wolsey Bayfield.

Parks
Bayfield Beach Provincial Park

References

Communities in Antigonish County, Nova Scotia